Fabiana is a feminine given name of Italian origin meaning "bean grower".

Notable people named Fabiana include:

 Fabiana Barreda (born 1967), Argentine artist

Fabiana de Barros (born 1957), Brazilian-born Swiss artist
 Fabiana Beltrame (born 1982), Brazilian rower
 Fabiana Bravo (born 1969), Argentine operatic soprano
Fabiana Bytyqi (born 1995), Czech professional boxer
 Fabiana Cantilo (born 1959), Argentine singer–songwriter
 Fabiana Claudino (born 1985), Brazilian volleyball player
 Fabiana Diniz (born 1981), Brazilian team handball player
 Fabiana López (born 1966), Mexican fencer
 Fabiana Luperini (born 1974), Italian cyclist
 Fabiana Masili (born 1978), Brazilian musician
 Fabiana Murer (born 1981), Brazilian pole vaulter
 Fabiana de Oliveira (born 1980), Brazilian volleyball player
 Fabiana Ríos (born 1964), Argentine politician
 Fabiana Semprebom (born 1984), Brazilian fashion model
 Fabiana Sgroi (born 1981), Italian sprint canoer
 Fabiana da Silva Simões (born 1989), Brazilian footballer
 Fabiana Udenio (born 1964), Argentine/Italian actress
 Fabiana Vallejos (born 1985), Argentine footballer